Qarah Kahriz (also Romanized as Qarah Kahrīz and Qareh Kahrīz) is a village in Ashna Khvor Rural District, in the Central District of Khomeyn County, Markazi Province, Iran. At the 2006 census, its population was 966, in 211 families.

References 

Populated places in Khomeyn County